Thomas Vincent Cooke (10 September 1913 – 1974) was an English professional footballer who played in the Football League for Bournemouth & Boscombe Athletic and Mansfield Town.

References

1913 births
1974 deaths
English footballers
Association football defenders
English Football League players
New Brighton A.F.C. players
Mansfield Town F.C. players
AFC Bournemouth players
Luton Town F.C. players